Məsəd (also, Maşad and Məşəd) is a village and municipality in the Agdash Rayon of Azerbaijan. It has a population of 1,382. The municipality consists of the villages of Məsəd and Gürcüva.

References 

Populated places in Agdash District